Libby Lyons is the Director of the Australian Government's Workplace Gender Equality Agency. She was appointed Director for a period of five years from October 2015. It has been said that Libby will play a key role in promoting and improving gender equality in Australian workplaces.

Early life 
Lyons was born in Tasmania and grew up in Melbourne. She was educated at Sacré Coeur School in Glen Iris.

After completing school, Libby trained as a primary school teacher and started her working life in the outer northern suburbs of Melbourne.

Career 
Lyons worked in senior management roles across the corporate and government sectors in the energy, resources and telecommunications industries.

She headed Corporate Affairs for BHP's Olympic Dam Project and has held senior roles at Atlas Iron, CITIC Pacific Mining, Alcoa of Australia and Western Power. She was also corporate relations manager at Telstra and Acting Chair and Non-Executive Director of listed entity Reclaim Industries.

Lyons has chaired a number of not-for-profits. She took on the position of Executive Chairman for Kalparrin, a Perth-based charity that supports families of children with special needs, in June 2013.

She was also on the Board of Directors and the Chair of SIDS and Kids WA.

Lyons stood for Liberal Party preselection prior to the 2008 Western Australian state election, losing to Bill Marmion in the seat of Nedlands. She also contested preselection for the House of Representatives prior to the 2010 federal election, losing to incumbent Tangney MP Dennis Jensen.

Director, Workplace Gender Equality Agency 
In her position as the Director of the Workplace Gender Equality Agency, Lyons has advocated to close the gender pay gap and break down occupational gender segregation in Australia.

Lyons is a strong advocate for ensuring flexible work practices are normalised for men, as well as women.

In November 2016, Lyons presented Australia’s gender equality scorecard (BS), based on the Agency’s latest data from employers, at the National Press Club in Canberra. In the address, Lyons called on Australian employers to take urgent action to address the gender pay gap.

Family 
Lyons comes from one of the prominent political families of Australia. She is the granddaughter of former Australian Prime Minister Joseph Lyons and Dame Enid Lyons who was the first woman elected to Australia's House of Representatives, and the first woman appointed to the federal cabinet.
Her father was Deputy Premier of Tasmania Kevin Lyons and her brother is Kevin Lyons QC, Judge of the Supreme Court of Victoria.

She was married to criminal lawyer, Michael Jones, who died in 2010.

She has since remarried to Dr George Bowen. She has one son, to her late husband.

References

Australian public servants
Living people
Australian corporate directors
Australian women in business
Year of birth missing (living people)